Federal elections were held in West Germany on 28 September 1969 to elect the members of the 6th Bundestag. The CDU/CSU remained the largest faction and the Social Democratic Party remained the largest single party in the Bundestag, winning 237 of the 518 seats. After the election, the SPD formed a coalition with the Free Democratic Party and SPD leader Willy Brandt became Chancellor.

Campaign
Upon the resignation of Chancellor Ludwig Erhard on 1 December 1966, a grand coalition of Christian Democrats and Social Democrats had governed West Germany under Federal Chancellor Kurt Georg Kiesinger (CDU) with SPD chairman Willy Brandt as vice-chancellor and foreign minister.

Economics Minister Karl Schiller (SPD) had proposed revaluing (increasing the external value of) the Deutsche Mark, West Germany's currency, to reduce the country's inflation rate and the rate of growth of the country's businesses' income.  He also wanted to reduce West Germany's economic dependence on the exports. However, his counterpart Finance Minister Franz-Josef Strauss (CSU) rejected the Deutsche Mark's revaluation, because his strong constituents, the Bavarian farmers, also opposed it. After all, the European Economic Community's foodstuffs prices were paid in US dollars, and the Deutsche Mark's revaluation would have made them less favourable for the West German farmers (i.e. more expensive for other Western Europeans to buy).

The coalition effectively ended already before the regular 1969 Bundestag elections, because of this revaluation conflict. In addition, enough West German voters were at last willing to give the Social Democratic leader, Foreign Minister Willy Brandt, a chance to govern West Germany. Brandt, who ran for the third time after 1961 and 1965, had shown sympathy towards those groups, like left-wing intellectuals and activists of the German student movement, who had felt ignored by the Christian Democrat-led coalition governments.  In addition, his clear intellect, remarkable self-control and honest manner appealed to ordinary West Germans.

Results

Results by state

Constituency seats

List seats

Aftermath

Willy Brandt, against the will of several party fellows like Herbert Wehner or Helmut Schmidt, chose to leave the grand coalition with the CDU/CSU, forming a social-liberal coalition with the Free Democratic Party (FDP) instead. On 21 October 1969 he was elected Chancellor of Germany, the first SPD chancellor in the postwar period, after the last Social Democrat holding this position had been Hermann Müller from 1928 to 1930. FDP chairman Walter Scheel succeeded Brandt as vice-chancellor and foreign minister. Brandt's government proceeded with the revaluation Schiller had proposed, raising the value of the mark by 9.3% in late October.

Disappointed Kiesinger bitterly complained about the faithless liberals. Though he had again achieved the plurality of votes for the CDU, he had to lead his party into opposition. He was succeeded as chairman by Rainer Barzel in 1971.

However the Cabinet Brandt I could only rely on an absolute majority (Kanzlermehrheit) of twelve votes in the Bundestag. Several party switches in protest against Brandt's Ostpolitik of FDP and SPD members resulted in the snap election of 1972.

Notes

References

Federal elections in Germany
1969 elections in Germany
1969 in West Germany
September 1969 events in Europe
Kurt Georg Kiesinger